Ivy Hill, Newark, New Jersey is a neighborhood in Newark, New Jersey, U.S.

Ivy Hill may also refer to:

Places in the U.S.
 Ivy Hill (Marriottsville, Maryland), a historic house and plantation
 Ivy Hill, Philadelphia, Pennsylvania, a section of the Cedarbrook neighborhood
 Ivy Hill Cemetery (Maryland), Laurel, Maryland
 Ivy Hill Cemetery (Philadelphia), Cedarbrook, Philadelphia, Pennsylvania
 Ivy Hill Cemetery (Alexandria, Virginia), Alexandria, Virginia
 Ivy Hill Cemetery (Smithfield, Virginia), listed on the National Register of Historic Places